Hassan Abdul Muthalib (born 3 November 1945) is a Malaysian animator, film director and critic, and artist who pioneered Malaysian animation. He was dubbed as the "Father of the Malaysian animation".

Personal life
Hassan is a father of three children. His two sons, Samad Hassan and Ahmad Hassan, are also involved in animation.

Filmography
 Hapuskan Nyamuk Aedes: Gunakan Ubat Jentik-Jentik (1977)
 Selamat Hari Natal (1979)
 Ikuti Peraturan Penggunaan Gas Memasak (1981)
 Hikayat Sang Kancil (1983)
 Mekanik (1983)
 Hikayat Sang Kancil dan Monyet (1984)
 Gagak Yang Bijak (1985)
 Singa Yang Haloba (1986)
 Arnab Yang Sombong (1986)
 Hikayat Sang kancil dan Buaya (1987)
 Jagalah Kebersihan Tandas (1987)
 Hormatilah Tangki Gas Anda (1987)
 Mat Gelap (1990)
 Silat Lagenda (animation film; 1998)
 At the End of Daybreak (2009)
 Zombiku Zombimu Jua (excerpt from Hantu Kak Limah Balik Rumah; 2010)
 Return to Nostalgia (2015)
 The Unsung HERO – Mat Sentol (2016)
 Thottam: The Garden (2017)

Bibliography
 Malaysian Cinema in a Bottle. Merpati Jingga. 2013. 
 From Deer Mouse to Mouse: 70 Years of Malaysian Animation. ASWARA. 2016.

Accolades
On 3 September 2018, Hassan with academician, Khoo Kay Kim chosen as the recipients of the 2018 Merdeka Awards presented by the Sultan of Perak, Nazrin Shah of Perak. Other awards received by Hassan include:

 Bapa Animasi Malaysia 2012
 Perintis Animasi Asia
 Ikon Animasi Kolej Komuniti 2010
 Kesan Khas Terbaik 1990
 Tokoh Seni Dalam Buku Pendidikan Seni Sekolah Tingkatan 1
 Anugerah Juri Dokumentari Terbaik 1989
 Anugerah Seri Angkasa 1983

References

External links
 

1945 births
Living people
Malaysian people of Malay descent
Malaysian Muslims
People from Kedah
Malaysian animators
Malaysian artists
Malaysian film directors
Malaysian writers